The Dogri script, also known as the Dogra Akkhar script (Dogri: नमें डोगरा अक्खर, ISO: Namēṁ Ḍōgrā Akkhar, Dogri pronunciation: [nəmẽː ɖoːgɾaː əkːʱəɾ]) is a writing system originally used for writing the Dogri language in Jammu and Kashmir in the northern part of the Indian subcontinent.

History 
Name Dogra Akkhar was created by the order of Maharaja Ranbir Singh of Jammu and Kashmir. It is a modified version of the old Dogra Akkhar script, which in turn was a Jammu variant of the Takri script.

Efforts of revival
Signboards in Name Dogra Akkhar were erected at Jammu Tawi railway station. However, the script is functionally extinct, with Devanagari being used to write Dogri now.

Unicode

Name Dogra Akkhar was added as a Unicode block to the Unicode Standard in June, 2018 (version 11.0). 

The Unicode block is named Dogra, at U+11800–U+1184F, and contains 60 characters:

References

External links 
 Dogri at Omniglot

Dogri language
Brahmic scripts
Sarada scripts
Obsolete writing systems